Maui is a fictional character from Walt Disney Animation Studios' 56th animated film, Moana. Created by directors Ron Clements and John Musker, and voiced by Dwayne Johnson, Maui is loosely based on Māui from Hawaiian mythology. In the film, Maui is depicted as a demigod who was abandoned by his parents and eventually adopted by the gods. He owns a fish hook which allows him to shape-shift into different animals. He helps Moana on her mission to restore the heart of Te Fiti after having stolen it and releasing devastation into the ocean.

Development
Maui is primarily based on Māui in Hawaiian mythology. Maui's backstory, however, was simplified so that he was an orphan.

Eric Goldberg worked on the hand-drawn animation used to depict Maui's sentient tattoos. During early development, the filmmakers considered the possibility of making the film with hand-drawn traditional animation, but only a few early animation tests were made in that style. In the final cut, only Maui's tattoos are hand-drawn.

Voice

On December 2, 2014, it was announced that Dwayne Johnson was in talks to voice Maui in Disney film Moana. A day later, Johnson tweeted that he was going to voice the character. Johnson stated that he first got the news of being the cast in the movie when he was going to China to promote a movie. Johnson's agent told him before he got on the plane. Johnson said hearing the news was "awesome". For his role, Johnson was paid $21 million.

Appearances

Moana

In Moana, Maui is known as a legend who owns a fish hook allowing him to shape-shift into different animals, and stole the heart of Te Fiti, causing the ocean to suffer. Moana later convinces Maui to help her restore the heart of Te Fiti. Maui claims that he needs his fish hook to restore the heart resulting in Moana and Maui meeting Tamatoa, a crab obsessed with shiny things. After successfully retrieving the fish hook, Maui and Moana set off to restore the heart. During their journey, Maui tells Moana about his past. He says that he was abandoned by his parents and adopted by the gods. When Moana and Maui find Te Ka, a spirit risen due to the stealing of the heart of Te Fiti, they fail to get past her and Maui's hook is badly damaged. Upset and let down, Maui leaves Moana. After Moana almost succeeds in getting past Te Ka, Maui rejoins Moana and helps distract Te Ka. Maui later fights Te Ka and destroys his hook. Moana realises that Te Ka is Te Fiti, corrupted without her heart. Moana restores the heart and Te Fiti who gifts Maui with a new fish hook.

Reception

Critical reception
Los Angeles Times called Maui a "boisterous agent of show-stopping supernatural chaos". The Oklahoman wrote that Maui's hand-drawn tattoos "[stole] the show".

References

Further reading

External links
 

Walt Disney Animation Studios characters
Dwayne Johnson
Fictional characters with superhuman strength
Fictional characters from Hawaii
Fictional demigods
Fictional orphans
Fictional sailors
Fictional shapeshifters
Film characters introduced in 2016
Animated characters introduced in 2016
Maui (mythology)
Moana (2016 film)
Male characters in animated films